Salvador Martin "Sam" Vadalabene (July 31, 1914 – May 1, 1994) was an American politician.

Born in Detroit, Michigan, Vadalabene served in the 29th Infantry Regiment in Europe during World War II. Vadalabene lived in Edwardsville, Illinois and served as auditor for the Edwardsville Township, Madison County, Illinois. Vadalabene served in the Illinois House of Representatives from 1967 to 1971 and then served in the Illinois Senate from 1971 until his death in 1994. He was a Democrat. Vadalabene died from a heart attack in a nursing home in Maryville, Illinois.

Notes

External links

1914 births
1994 deaths
Military personnel from Michigan
Politicians from Detroit
People from Edwardsville, Illinois
Democratic Party members of the Illinois House of Representatives
Democratic Party Illinois state senators
20th-century American politicians